is the debut studio album by Japanese singer Yōko Oginome. Released through Victor Entertainment on September 5, 1984, the album features the singles "Mirai Kōkai (Sailing)" and "Sayonara kara Hajimaru Monogatari", as well as "Sapphire-iro no Prelude", a cover of Marjorie Noël's "Dans le meme wagon". It was reissued on March 24, 2010 with two bonus tracks as part of Oginome's 25th anniversary celebration.

The album peaked at No. 24 on Oricon's albums chart and sold over 23,000 copies.

Track listing

Charts

References

External links
 
 
 

1984 debut albums
Yōko Oginome albums
Japanese-language albums
Victor Entertainment albums